Mahtutabad (also Romanized as Maḩţūţābād; also known as Maţūţābād) is a village in Mohammadabad Rural District, in the Central District of Anbarabad County, Kerman Province, Iran. At the 2006 census, its population was 540, in 97 families.

References 

Populated places in Anbarabad County